Russia women's national bandy team is the bandy team representing Russia. The team competes in the Women's Bandy World Championship.

After the International Olympic Committee's recommendations following the 2022 Russian invasion of Ukraine, the Federation of International Bandy excluded Russia from participating in the 2022 Women's Bandy World Championship.

See also
Bandy
Rink bandy
Women's Bandy World Championship
Great Britain women's national bandy team
Sweden women's national bandy team
Finland women's national bandy team
Norway women's national bandy team
Switzerland women's national bandy team
China women's national bandy team
Canada women's national bandy team
United States women's national bandy team
Hungary women's national bandy team
Soviet Union women's national bandy team

References

External links
Official site (in Russian)

Bandy in Russia
National bandy teams
Bandy